The Battle of Azule was fought on 6 September 1886, between the forces of Ras Darge Sahle Selassie of Shewa and a force of Arsi Oromo. It was part of a broader series of expansion campaigns done under Menelik II, Negus of Shewa, referred to by some historians as the Agar Maqnat. The battle of Azule was important as it represents the crushing of a large Arsi army by one under Menelik; it also demonstrates the dynamic of gun-wielding Shewans fighting Spear-wielding Arsi that many historians like to stress when discussing Menelik's expansions; it also retains symbolic and historic importance in the politics and identities of many.

Background

Ras Darge Sahle Selassie arrived in Arsi-country with the Negus Menelik II's army. Though Menelik II eventually left Arsi-country, Darghe stayed and established a Katama (roughly: garrison / camp) at Azule. The Katama had 3 layers, each fortified by a wall.

Battle
Ras Darge Sahle Selassie, through the use of informants, knew of the Arsi plan to attack his Katama on September 6, 1886. Therefore, he organized his gunmen along the second wall of his Katama. Darghe planned for his gunmen to hold fire until the Arsi had successfully entered the first layer of his Katama. This way, they would be trapped when the order was given to start gunfire. When the Arsi Oromo attacked, Darghe's gunmen, either scared or trigger happy, opened fire before Darghe's order. The result was still an overwhelming Shewan success, but many sources record Darghe punishing his commanders, some of whom were his sons. In the months following this victory, Darge subdued Arsi but did not move to annex the southern Bale province.

Citations

References
 
 

1886 in Ethiopia
Battles involving Ethiopia
Conflicts in 1886
Menelik's Expansion Campaigns